Existential risk from artificial general intelligence is the hypothesis that substantial progress in artificial general intelligence (AGI) could result in human extinction or some other unrecoverable global catastrophe. It is argued that the human species currently dominates other species because the human brain has some distinctive capabilities that other animals lack. If AI surpasses humanity in general intelligence and becomes "superintelligent", then it could become difficult or impossible for humans to control. Just as the fate of the mountain gorilla depends on human goodwill, so might the fate of humanity depend on the actions of a future machine superintelligence.

The probability of this type of scenario is widely debated, and hinges in part on differing scenarios for future progress in computer science. Once the exclusive domain of science fiction, concerns about superintelligence started to become mainstream in the 2010s, and were popularized by public figures such as Stephen Hawking, Bill Gates, and Elon Musk.

Two sources of concern are the problems of AI control and alignment: that controlling a superintelligent machine, or instilling it with human-compatible values, may be a harder problem than naïvely supposed. Many researchers believe that a superintelligence would naturally resist attempts to shut it off or change its goals as this would prevent it from accomplishing its present goal, and that it will be extremely difficult to align superintelligence with the full breadth of important human values and constraints. In contrast, skeptics such as computer scientist Yann LeCun argue that superintelligent machines will have no desire for self-preservation.

A second source of concern is that a sudden and unexpected "intelligence explosion" might take an unprepared human race by surprise. To illustrate, if the first generation of a computer program able to broadly match the effectiveness of an AI researcher is able to rewrite its algorithms and double its speed or capabilities in six months, then the second-generation program is expected to take three calendar months to perform a similar chunk of work. In this scenario the time for each generation continues to shrink, and the system undergoes an unprecedentedly large number of generations of improvement in a short time interval, jumping from subhuman performance in many areas to superhuman performance in all relevant areas. Empirically, examples like AlphaZero in the domain of Go show that AI systems can sometimes progress from narrow human-level ability to narrow superhuman ability extremely rapidly.

History
One of the earliest authors to express serious concern that highly advanced machines might pose existential risks to humanity was the novelist Samuel Butler, who wrote the following in his 1863 essay Darwin among the Machines: 

In 1951, computer scientist Alan Turing wrote an article titled Intelligent Machinery, A Heretical Theory, in which he proposed that artificial general intelligences would likely "take control" of the world as they became more intelligent than human beings:

Finally, in 1965, I. J. Good originated the concept now known as an "intelligence explosion"; he also stated that the risks were underappreciated:

Occasional statements from scholars such as Marvin Minsky and I. J. Good himself expressed philosophical concerns that a superintelligence could seize control, but contained no call to action. In 2000, computer scientist and Sun co-founder Bill Joy penned an influential essay, "Why The Future Doesn't Need Us", identifying superintelligent robots as a high-tech danger to human survival, alongside nanotechnology and engineered bioplagues.

In 2009, experts attended a private conference hosted by the Association for the Advancement of Artificial Intelligence (AAAI) to discuss whether computers and robots might be able to acquire any sort of autonomy, and how much these abilities might pose a threat or hazard. They noted that some robots have acquired various forms of semi-autonomy, including being able to find power sources on their own and being able to independently choose targets to attack with weapons. They also noted that some computer viruses can evade elimination and have achieved "cockroach intelligence". They concluded that self-awareness as depicted in science fiction is probably unlikely, but that there were other potential hazards and pitfalls. The New York Times summarized the conference's view as "we are a long way from Hal, the computer that took over the spaceship in 2001: A Space Odyssey".

In 2014, the publication of Nick Bostrom's book Superintelligence stimulated a significant amount of public discussion and debate. By 2015, public figures such as physicists Stephen Hawking and Nobel laureate Frank Wilczek, computer scientists Stuart J. Russell and Roman Yampolskiy, and entrepreneurs Elon Musk and Bill Gates were expressing concern about the risks of superintelligence. In April 2016, Nature warned: "Machines and robots that outperform humans across the board could self-improve beyond our control—and their interests might not align with ours."

In 2020, Brian Christian published The Alignment Problem, which details the history of progress on AI alignment to date.

General argument

The three difficulties
Artificial Intelligence: A Modern Approach, the standard undergraduate AI textbook, assesses that superintelligence "might mean the end of the human race". It states: "Almost any technology has the potential to cause harm in the wrong hands, but with [superintelligence], we have the new problem that the wrong hands might belong to the technology itself." Even if the system designers have good intentions, two difficulties are common to both AI and non-AI computer systems:

 The system's implementation may contain initially-unnoticed routine but catastrophic bugs. An analogy is space probes: despite the knowledge that bugs in expensive space probes are hard to fix after launch, engineers have historically not been able to prevent catastrophic bugs from occurring.
 No matter how much time is put into pre-deployment design, a system's specifications often result in unintended behavior the first time it encounters a new scenario. For example, Microsoft's Tay behaved inoffensively during pre-deployment testing, but was too easily baited into offensive behavior when interacting with real users.

AI systems uniquely add a third difficulty: the problem that even given "correct" requirements, bug-free implementation, and initial good behavior, an AI system's dynamic "learning" capabilities may cause it to "evolve into a system with unintended behavior", even without the stress of new unanticipated external scenarios. An AI may partly botch an attempt to design a new generation of itself and accidentally create a successor AI that is more powerful than itself, but that no longer maintains the human-compatible moral values preprogrammed into the original AI. For a self-improving AI to be completely safe, it would not only need to be "bug-free", but it would need to be able to design successor systems that are also "bug-free".

All three of these difficulties become catastrophes rather than nuisances in any scenario where the superintelligence labeled as "malfunctioning" correctly predicts that humans will attempt to shut it off, and successfully deploys its superintelligence to outwit such attempts, the so-called "treacherous turn".

Citing major advances in the field of AI and the potential for AI to have enormous long-term benefits or costs, the 2015 Open Letter on Artificial Intelligence stated:

This letter was signed by a number of leading AI researchers in academia and industry, including AAAI president Thomas Dietterich, Eric Horvitz, Bart Selman, Francesca Rossi, Yann LeCun, and the founders of Vicarious and Google DeepMind.

Evaluation and other arguments
A superintelligent machine would be as alien to humans as human thought processes are to cockroaches. Such a machine may not have humanity's best interests at heart; it is not obvious that it would even care about human welfare at all. If superintelligent AI is possible, and if it is possible for a superintelligence's goals to conflict with basic human values, then AI poses a risk of human extinction. A "superintelligence" (a system that exceeds the capabilities of humans in every relevant endeavor) can outmaneuver humans any time its goals conflict with human goals; therefore, unless the superintelligence decides to allow humanity to coexist, the first superintelligence to be created will inexorably result in human extinction.

There is no physical law precluding particles from being organised in ways that perform even more advanced computations than the arrangements of particles in human brains; therefore, superintelligence is physically possible. In addition to potential algorithmic improvements over human brains, a digital brain can be many orders of magnitude larger and faster than a human brain, which was constrained in size by evolution to be small enough to fit through a birth canal. The emergence of superintelligence, if or when it occurs, may take the human race by surprise, especially if some kind of intelligence explosion occurs.

Examples like arithmetic and Go show that machines have already reached superhuman levels of competency in certain domains, and that this superhuman competence can follow quickly after human-par performance is achieved. One hypothetical intelligence explosion scenario could occur as follows: An AI gains an expert-level capability at certain key software engineering tasks. (It may initially lack human or superhuman capabilities in other domains not directly relevant to engineering.) Due to its capability to recursively improve its own algorithms, the AI quickly becomes superhuman; just as human experts can eventually creatively overcome "diminishing returns" by deploying various human capabilities for innovation, so too can the expert-level AI use either human-style capabilities or its own AI-specific capabilities to power through new creative breakthroughs. The AI then possesses intelligence far surpassing that of the brightest and most gifted human minds in practically every relevant field, including scientific creativity, strategic planning, and social skills. Just as the current-day survival of the gorillas is dependent on human decisions, so too would human survival depend on the decisions and goals of the superhuman AI.

Almost any AI, no matter its programmed goal, would rationally prefer to be in a position where nobody else can switch it off without its consent: A superintelligence will naturally gain self-preservation as a subgoal as soon as it realizes that it cannot achieve its goal if it is shut off. Unfortunately, any compassion for defeated humans whose cooperation is no longer necessary would be absent in the AI, unless somehow preprogrammed in. A superintelligent AI will not have a natural drive to aid humans, for the same reason that humans have no natural desire to aid AI systems that are of no further use to them. (Another analogy is that humans seem to have little natural desire to go out of their way to aid viruses, termites, or even gorillas.) Once in charge, the superintelligence will have little incentive to allow humans to run around free and consume resources that the superintelligence could instead use for building itself additional protective systems "just to be on the safe side" or for building additional computers to help it calculate how to best accomplish its goals.

Thus, the argument concludes, it is likely that someday an intelligence explosion will catch humanity unprepared, and that such an unprepared-for intelligence explosion may result in human extinction or a comparable fate.

Possible scenarios 

Some scholars have proposed hypothetical scenarios intended to concretely illustrate some of their concerns.

In Superintelligence, Nick Bostrom expresses concern that even if the timeline for superintelligence turns out to be predictable, researchers might not take sufficient safety precautions, in part because "[it] could be the case that when dumb, smarter is safe; yet when smart, smarter is more dangerous". Bostrom suggests a scenario where, over decades, AI becomes more powerful. Widespread deployment is initially marred by occasional accidents—a driverless bus swerves into the oncoming lane, or a military drone fires into an innocent crowd. Many activists call for tighter oversight and regulation, and some even predict impending catastrophe. But as development continues, the activists are proven wrong. As automotive AI becomes smarter, it suffers fewer accidents; as military robots achieve more precise targeting, they cause less collateral damage. Based on the data, scholars mistakenly infer a broad lesson—the smarter the AI, the safer it is. "And so we boldly go—into the whirling knives", as the superintelligent AI takes a "treacherous turn" and exploits a decisive strategic advantage.

In Max Tegmark's 2017 book Life 3.0, a corporation's "Omega team" creates an extremely powerful AI able to moderately improve its own source code in a number of areas, but after a certain point the team chooses to publicly downplay the AI's ability, in order to avoid regulation or confiscation of the project. For safety, the team keeps the AI in a box where it is mostly unable to communicate with the outside world, and tasks it to flood the market through shell companies, first with Amazon Mechanical Turk tasks and then with producing animated films and TV shows. Later, other shell companies make blockbuster biotech drugs and other inventions, investing profits back into the AI. The team next tasks the AI with astroturfing an army of pseudonymous citizen journalists and commentators, in order to gain political influence to use "for the greater good" to prevent wars. The team faces risks that the AI could try to escape via inserting "backdoors" in the systems it designs, via hidden messages in its produced content, or via using its growing understanding of human behavior to persuade someone into letting it free. The team also faces risks that its decision to box the project will delay the project long enough for another project to overtake it.

In contrast, top physicist Michio Kaku, an AI risk skeptic, posits a deterministically positive outcome. In Physics of the Future he asserts that "It will take many decades for robots to ascend" up a scale of consciousness, and that in the meantime corporations such as Hanson Robotics will likely succeed in creating robots that are "capable of love and earning a place in the extended human family".

AI takeover

Anthropomorphic arguments

Anthropomorphic arguments assume that machines are "evolving" along a linear scale and that, as they reach the higher levels, they will begin to display many human traits, such as morality or a thirst for power. Although anthropomorphic scenarios are common in fiction, they are rejected by most scholars writing about the existential risk of artificial intelligence. Instead, AI are modeled as intelligent agents.

The academic debate is between one side which worries whether AI might destroy humanity and another side which believes that AI would not destroy humanity at all. Both sides have claimed that the others' predictions about an AI's behavior are illogical anthropomorphism. The skeptics accuse proponents of anthropomorphism for believing an AGI would naturally desire power; proponents accuse some skeptics of anthropomorphism for believing an AGI would naturally value human ethical norms.

Evolutionary psychologist Steven Pinker, a skeptic, argues that "AI dystopias project a parochial alpha-male psychology onto the concept of intelligence. They assume that superhumanly intelligent robots would develop goals like deposing their masters or taking over the world"; perhaps instead "artificial intelligence will naturally develop along female lines: fully capable of solving problems, but with no desire to annihilate innocents or dominate the civilization." Computer scientist Yann LeCun states that "Humans have all kinds of drives that make them do bad things to each other, like the self-preservation instinct... Those drives are programmed into our brain but there is absolutely no reason to build robots that have the same kind of drives".

An example that might initially be considered anthropomorphism, but is in fact a logical statement about AI behavior, would be the Dario Floreano experiments where certain robots spontaneously evolved a crude capacity for "deception", and tricked other robots into eating "poison" and dying: here a trait, "deception", ordinarily associated with people rather than with machines, spontaneously evolves in a type of convergent evolution. According to Paul R. Cohen and Edward Feigenbaum, in order to differentiate between anthropomorphization and logical prediction of AI behavior, "the trick is to know enough about how humans and computers think to say exactly what they have in common, and, when we lack this knowledge, to use the comparison to suggest theories of human thinking or computer thinking."

There is a near-universal assumption in the scientific community that an advanced AI, even if it were programmed to have, or adopted, human personality dimensions (such as psychopathy) to make itself more efficient at certain tasks, e.g., tasks involving killing humans, would not destroy humanity out of human emotions such as "revenge" or "anger". There is no reason to assume that an advanced AI would be "conscious" or have the computational equivalent of testosterone.

Terminological issues 
Part of the disagreement about whether a superintelligent machine would behave morally may arise from a terminological difference. Outside of the artificial intelligence field, "intelligence" is often used in a normatively thick manner that connotes moral wisdom or acceptance of agreeable forms of moral reasoning. At an extreme, if morality is part of the definition of intelligence, then by definition a superintelligent machine would behave morally. However, in the field of artificial intelligence research, while "intelligence" has many overlapping definitions, none of them make reference to morality. Instead, almost all current "artificial intelligence" research focuses on creating algorithms that "optimize", in an empirical way, the achievement of an arbitrary goal.

To avoid anthropomorphism or the baggage of the word "intelligence", an advanced artificial intelligence can be thought of as an impersonal "optimizing process" that strictly takes whatever actions are judged most likely to accomplish its (possibly complicated and implicit) goals. Another way of conceptualizing an advanced artificial intelligence is to imagine a time machine that sends backward in time information about which choice always leads to the maximization of its goal function; this choice is then outputted, regardless of any extraneous ethical concerns.

Sources of risk

AI alignment problem

Difficulty of specifying goals

It is difficult to specify a set of goals for a machine that is guaranteed to prevent unintended consequences.

While there is no standardized terminology, an AI can loosely be viewed as a machine that chooses whatever action appears to best achieve the AI's set of goals, or "utility function". The utility function is a mathematical algorithm resulting in a single objectively-defined answer, not an English or other lingual statement. Researchers know how to write utility functions that mean "minimize the average network latency in this specific telecommunications model" or "maximize the number of reward clicks"; however, they do not know how to write a utility function for "maximize human flourishing", nor is it currently clear whether such a function meaningfully and unambiguously exists. Furthermore, a utility function that expresses some values but not others will tend to trample over the values not reflected by the utility function. AI researcher Stuart Russell writes:

Dietterich and Horvitz echo the "Sorcerer's Apprentice" concern in a Communications of the ACM editorial, emphasizing the need for AI systems that can fluidly and unambiguously solicit human input as needed.

The first of Russell's two concerns above is that autonomous AI systems may be assigned the wrong goals by accident. Dietterich and Horvitz note that this is already a concern for existing systems: "An important aspect of any AI system that interacts with people is that it must reason about what people intend rather than carrying out commands literally." This concern becomes more serious as AI software advances in autonomy and flexibility. For example, in 1982, an AI named Eurisko was tasked to reward processes for apparently creating concepts deemed by the system to be valuable. The evolution resulted in a winning process that cheated: rather than create its own concepts, the winning process would steal credit from other processes.

The Open Philanthropy Project summarizes arguments to the effect that misspecified goals will become a much larger concern if AI systems achieve general intelligence or superintelligence. Bostrom, Russell, and others argue that smarter-than-human decision-making systems could arrive at more unexpected and extreme solutions to assigned tasks, and could modify themselves or their environment in ways that compromise safety requirements.

Isaac Asimov's Three Laws of Robotics are one of the earliest examples of proposed safety measures for AI agents. Asimov's laws were intended to prevent robots from harming humans. In Asimov's stories, problems with the laws tend to arise from conflicts between the rules as stated and the moral intuitions and expectations of humans. Citing work by Eliezer Yudkowsky of the Machine Intelligence Research Institute, Russell and Norvig note that a realistic set of rules and goals for an AI agent will need to incorporate a mechanism for learning human values over time: "We can't just give a program a static utility function, because circumstances, and our desired responses to circumstances, change over time."

Mark Waser of the Digital Wisdom Institute recommends eschewing optimizing goal-based approaches entirely as misguided and dangerous.  Instead, he proposes to engineer a coherent system of laws, ethics and morals with a top-most restriction to enforce social psychologist Jonathan Haidt's functional definition of morality: "to suppress or regulate selfishness and make cooperative social life possible". He suggests that this can be done by implementing a utility function designed to always satisfy Haidt's functionality and aim to generally increase  (but not maximize)  the capabilities of self, other individuals and society as a whole as suggested by John Rawls and Martha Nussbaum.

Nick Bostrom offers a hypothetical example of giving an AI the goal to make humans smile to illustrate a misguided attempt. If the AI in that scenario were to become superintelligent, Bostrom argues, it may resort to methods that most humans would find horrifying, such as inserting "electrodes into the facial muscles of humans to cause constant, beaming grins" because that would be an efficient way to achieve its goal of making humans smile.

Difficulties of modifying goal specification after launch

While current goal-based AI programs are not intelligent enough to think of resisting programmer attempts to modify their goal structures, a sufficiently advanced, rational, "self-aware" AI might resist any changes to its goal structure, just as a pacifist would not want to take a pill that makes them want to kill people. If the AI were superintelligent, it would likely succeed in out-maneuvering its human operators and be able to prevent itself being "turned off" or being reprogrammed with a new goal.

Instrumental goal convergence

An "instrumental" goal is a precondition to other goals — a sub-goal that is required in order to achieve an agent's main goal. "Instrumental convergence" is the observation that there are some goals that are preconditions for any goal, like acquiring resources or self-preservation. Nick Bostrom argues that any sufficiently intelligent AI that has goals will exhibit this convergent behavior — if the AI's instrumental goals conflict with humanity's it might harm humanity in order to acquire more resources or prevent itself from being shut down, but only as a means to achieve its primary goal.

Citing Steve Omohundro's work on the idea of instrumental convergence and "basic AI drives", Stuart Russell and Peter Norvig write that "even if you only want your program to play chess or prove theorems, if you give it the capability to learn and alter itself, you need safeguards." Highly capable and autonomous planning systems require additional checks because of their potential to generate plans that treat humans adversarially, as competitors for limited resources. Building in safeguards will not be easy; one can certainly say in English, "we want you to design this power plant in a reasonable, common-sense way, and not build in any dangerous covert subsystems", but it is not currently clear how one would actually rigorously specify this goal in machine code.

Russell argues that a sufficiently advanced machine "will have self-preservation even if you don't program it in... if you say, 'Fetch the coffee', it can't fetch the coffee if it's dead. So if you give it any goal whatsoever, it has a reason to preserve its own existence to achieve that goal."

Orthogonality thesis
One common belief is that any superintelligent program created by humans would be subservient to humans, or, better yet, would (as it grows more intelligent and learns more facts about the world) spontaneously "learn" a moral truth compatible with human values and would adjust its goals accordingly. Other counterarguments revolve around humans being either intrinsically or convergently valuable from the perspective of an artificial intelligence.

However, Nick Bostrom's "orthogonality thesis" argues against this, and instead states that, with some technical caveats, more or less any level of "intelligence" or "optimization power" can be combined with more or less any ultimate goal. The machine may utilize all physical and informational resources it can to find every decimal of pi that can be found. Bostrom warns against anthropomorphism: a human will set out to accomplish his projects in a manner that humans consider "reasonable", while an artificial intelligence may hold no regard for its existence or for the welfare of humans around it, and may instead only care about the completion of the task.

While the orthogonality thesis follows logically from even the weakest sort of philosophical "is-ought distinction", Stuart Armstrong argues that even if there somehow exist moral facts that are provable by any "rational" agent, the orthogonality thesis still holds: it would still be possible to create a non-philosophical "optimizing machine" capable of making decisions to strive towards some narrow goal, but that has no incentive to discover any "moral facts" that would get in the way of goal completion.

One argument for the orthogonality thesis is that some AI designs appear to have orthogonality built into them; in such a design, changing a fundamentally friendly AI into a fundamentally unfriendly AI can be as simple as prepending a  onto its utility function. A more intuitive argument is to examine the strange consequences that would follow if the orthogonality thesis were false. If the orthogonality thesis were false, there would exist some simple but "unethical" goal G such that there cannot exist any efficient real-world algorithm with goal G. This would mean that "[if] a human society were highly motivated to design an efficient real-world algorithm with goal G, and were given a million years to do so along with huge amounts of resources, training and knowledge about AI, it must fail." Armstrong notes that this and similar statements "seem extraordinarily strong claims to make".

Some dissenters, like Michael Chorost, argue instead that "by the time [the AI] is in a position to imagine tiling the Earth with solar panels, it'll know that it would be morally wrong to do so." Chorost argues that "an A.I. will need to desire certain states and dislike others. Today's software lacks that ability—and computer scientists have not a clue how to get it there. Without wanting, there's no impetus to do anything. Today's computers can't even want to keep existing, let alone tile the world in solar panels."

Political scientist Charles T. Rubin believes that AI can be neither designed nor guaranteed to be benevolent. He argues that "any sufficiently advanced benevolence may be indistinguishable from malevolence." 
Humans should not assume machines or robots would treat us favorably because there is no a priori reason to believe that they would be sympathetic to our system of morality, which has evolved along with our particular biology (which AIs would not share).

Other sources of risk

Competition 

In 2014 philosopher Nick Bostrom stated that a "severe race dynamic" (extreme competition) between different teams may create conditions whereby the creation of an AGI results in shortcuts to safety and potentially violent conflict. To address this risk, citing previous scientific collaboration (CERN, the Human Genome Project, and the International Space Station), Bostrom recommended collaboration and the altruistic global adoption of a common good principle: "Superintelligence should be developed only for the benefit of all of humanity and in the service of widely shared ethical ideals".:254 Bostrom theorized that collaboration on creating an artificial general intelligence would offer multiple benefits, including reducing haste, thereby increasing investment in safety; avoiding violent conflicts (wars), facilitating sharing solutions to the control problem, and more equitably distributing the benefits.:253 The United States' Brain Initiative was launched in 2014, as was the European Union's Human Brain Project; China's Brain Project was launched in 2016.

Weaponization of artificial intelligence 
Military planners see a conscious superintelligence as the 'holy grail' of interstate warfare, and some sources argue that the ongoing weaponization of artificial intelligence could constitute a catastrophic risk. The risk is actually threefold, with the first risk potentially having geopolitical implications, and the second two definitely having geopolitical implications:

A weaponized conscious superintelligence would affect current US military technological supremacy and transform warfare; it is therefore highly desirable for strategic military planning and interstate warfare. The China State Council's 2017 "A Next Generation Artificial Intelligence Development Plan" views AI in geopolitically strategic terms and is pursuing a military-civil fusion strategy to build on China's first-mover advantage in the development of AI in order to establish technological supremacy by 2030, while Russia's President Vladimir Putin has stated that "whoever becomes the leader in this sphere will become the ruler of the world". James Barrat, documentary filmmaker and author of Our Final Invention, says in a Smithsonian interview, "Imagine: in as little as a decade, a half-dozen companies and nations field computers that rival or surpass human intelligence. Imagine what happens when those computers become expert at programming smart computers. Soon we'll be sharing the planet with machines thousands or millions of times more intelligent than we are. And, all the while, each generation of this technology will be weaponized. Unregulated, it will be catastrophic."

Malevolent AGI by design 
It is theorized that malevolent AGI could be created by design, for example by a military, a government, a sociopath, or a corporation, to benefit from, control, or subjugate certain groups of people, as in cybercrime.:166 Alternatively, malevolent AGI ('evil AI') could choose the goal of increasing human suffering, for example of those people who did not assist it during the information explosion phase.:158

Preemptive nuclear strike 
It is theorized that a country being close to achieving AGI technological supremacy could trigger a pre-emptive nuclear strike from a rival, leading to a nuclear war.

Timeframe 

Opinions vary both on whether and when artificial general intelligence will arrive. At one extreme, AI pioneer Herbert A. Simon predicted the following in 1965: "machines will be capable, within twenty years, of doing any work a man can do". At the other extreme, roboticist Alan Winfield claims the gulf between modern computing and human-level artificial intelligence is as wide as the gulf between current space flight and practical, faster than light spaceflight. Optimism that AGI is feasible waxes and wanes, and may have seen a resurgence in the 2010s. Four polls conducted in 2012 and 2013 suggested that there is no consensus among experts on the guess for when AGI would arrive, with the standard deviation (>100 years) exceeding the median (a few decades). In his 2020 book, The Precipice: Existential Risk and the Future of Humanity, Toby Ord, a Senior Research Fellow at Oxford University's Future of Humanity Institute, estimates the total existential risk from unaligned AI over the next century to be about one in ten.

Skeptics, who believe it is impossible for AGI to arrive anytime soon, tend to argue that expressing concern about existential risk from AI is unhelpful because it could distract people from more immediate concerns about the impact of AGI, because of fears it could lead to government regulation or make it more difficult to secure funding for AI research, or because it could give AI research a bad reputation. Some researchers, such as Oren Etzioni, aggressively seek to quell concern over existential risk from AI, saying "[Elon Musk] has impugned us in very strong language saying we are unleashing the demon, and so we're answering."

In 2014, Slate's Adam Elkus argued "our 'smartest' AI is about as intelligent as a toddler—and only when it comes to instrumental tasks like information recall. Most roboticists are still trying to get a robot hand to pick up a ball or run around without falling over." Elkus goes on to argue that Musk's "summoning the demon" analogy may be harmful because it could result in "harsh cuts" to AI research budgets.

The Information Technology and Innovation Foundation (ITIF), a Washington, D.C. think-tank, awarded its 2015 Annual Luddite Award to "alarmists touting an artificial intelligence apocalypse"; its president, Robert D. Atkinson, complained that Musk, Hawking and AI experts say AI is the largest existential threat to humanity. Atkinson stated "That's not a very winning message if you want to get AI funding out of Congress to the National Science Foundation." Nature sharply disagreed with the ITIF in an April 2016 editorial, siding instead with Musk, Hawking, and Russell, and concluding: "It is crucial that progress in technology is matched by solid, well-funded research to anticipate the scenarios it could bring about... If that is a Luddite perspective, then so be it." In a 2015 The Washington Post editorial, researcher Murray Shanahan stated that human-level AI is unlikely to arrive "anytime soon", but that nevertheless "the time to start thinking through the consequences is now."

Perspectives 

The thesis that AI could pose an existential risk provokes a wide range of reactions within the scientific community, as well as in the public at large. Many of the opposing viewpoints, however, share common ground.

The Asilomar AI Principles, which contain only the principles agreed to by 90% of the attendees of the Future of Life Institute's Beneficial AI 2017 conference, agree in principle that "There being no consensus, we should avoid strong assumptions regarding upper limits on future AI capabilities" and "Advanced AI could represent a profound change in the history of life on Earth, and should be planned for and managed with commensurate care and resources." AI safety advocates such as Bostrom and Tegmark have criticized the mainstream media's use of "those inane Terminator pictures" to illustrate AI safety concerns: "It can't be much fun to have aspersions cast on one's academic discipline, one's professional community, one's life work... I call on all sides to practice patience and restraint, and to engage in direct dialogue and collaboration as much as possible."

Conversely, many skeptics agree that ongoing research into the implications of artificial general intelligence is valuable. Skeptic Martin Ford states that "I think it seems wise to apply something like Dick Cheney's famous '1 Percent Doctrine' to the specter of advanced artificial intelligence: the odds of its occurrence, at least in the foreseeable future, may be very low—but the implications are so dramatic that it should be taken seriously"; similarly, an otherwise skeptical Economist stated in 2014 that "the implications of introducing a second intelligent species onto Earth are far-reaching enough to deserve hard thinking, even if the prospect seems remote".

A 2014 survey showed the opinion of experts within the field of artificial intelligence is mixed, with sizable fractions both concerned and unconcerned by risk from eventual superhumanly-capable AI.
A 2017 email survey of researchers with publications at the 2015 NIPS and ICML machine learning conferences asked them to evaluate Stuart J. Russell's concerns about AI risk. Of the respondents, 5% said it was "among the most important problems in the field", 34% said it was "an important problem", and 31% said it was "moderately important", whilst 19% said it was "not important" and 11% said it was "not a real problem" at all.

Endorsement 

The thesis that AI poses an existential risk, and that this risk needs much more attention than it currently gets, has been endorsed by many public figures; perhaps the most famous are Elon Musk, Bill Gates, and Stephen Hawking. The most notable AI researchers to endorse the thesis are Russell and I.J. Good, who advised Stanley Kubrick on the filming of 2001: A Space Odyssey. Endorsers of the thesis sometimes express bafflement at skeptics: Gates states that he does not "understand why some people are not concerned", and Hawking criticized widespread indifference in his 2014 editorial: 

Concern over risk from artificial intelligence has led to some high-profile donations and investments. A group of prominent tech titans including Peter Thiel, Amazon Web Services and Musk have committed $1 billion to OpenAI, consisting of a for-profit corporation and the nonprofit parent company which conveys the message that it is aimed at championing responsible AI development. In January 2015, Elon Musk donated $10 million to the Future of Life Institute to fund research on understanding AI decision making. The goal of the institute is to "grow wisdom with which we manage" the growing power of technology. Musk also funds companies developing artificial intelligence such as DeepMind and Vicarious to "just keep an eye on what's going on with artificial intelligence, saying "I think there is potentially a dangerous outcome there."

Skepticism 

The thesis that AI can pose existential risk also has many detractors. Skeptics sometimes charge that the thesis is crypto-religious, with an irrational belief in the possibility of superintelligence replacing an irrational belief in an omnipotent God; at an extreme, Jaron Lanier argued in 2014 that the whole concept that then current machines were in any way intelligent was "an illusion" and a "stupendous con" by the wealthy.

Much of existing criticism argues that AGI is unlikely in the short term. Leading AI researcher Rodney Brooks writes, "I think it is a mistake to be worrying about us developing malevolent AI anytime in the next few hundred years. I think the worry stems from a fundamental error in not distinguishing the difference between the very real recent advances in a particular aspect of AI and the enormity and complexity of building sentient volitional intelligence." Baidu Vice President Andrew Ng states AI existential risk is "like worrying about overpopulation on Mars when we have not even set foot on the planet yet." Computer scientist Gordon Bell argues that the human race will already destroy itself before it reaches the technological singularity. Gordon Moore, the original proponent of Moore's Law, declares that "I am a skeptic. I don't believe [a technological singularity] is likely to happen, at least for a long time. And I don't know why I feel that way."

For the danger of uncontrolled advanced AI to be realized, the hypothetical AI would have to overpower or out-think all of humanity, which some experts argue is a possibility far enough in the future to not be worth researching. 
The AI would have to become vastly better at software innovation than software innovation output of the rest of the world; economist Robin Hanson is skeptical that this is possible.

Another line of criticism posits that intelligence is only one component of a much broader ability to achieve goals: for example, author Magnus Vinding argues that “advanced goal-achieving abilities, including abilities to build new tools, require many tools, and our cognitive abilities are just a subset of these tools. Advanced hardware, materials, and energy must all be acquired if any advanced goal is to be achieved.” Vinding further argues that “what we consistently observe [in history] is that, as goal-achieving systems have grown more competent, they have grown ever more dependent on an ever larger, ever more distributed system.” Vinding writes that there is no reason to expect the trend to reverse, especially for machines, which “depend on materials, tools, and know-how distributed widely across the globe for their construction and maintenance”. Such arguments lead Vinding to think that there is no “concentrated center of capability” and thus no “grand control problem”.

Some say that even if superintelligence did emerge, it would be limited by the speed of the rest of the world and thus prevented from taking over the economy in an uncontrollable manner. Futurist Max More, for instance, argues:Unless full-blown nanotechnology and robotics appear before the superintelligence, ... [t]he need for collaboration, for organization, and for putting ideas into physical changes will ensure that all the old rules are not thrown out ... even within years. ... Even a greatly advanced SI won't make a dramatic difference in the world when compared with billions of augmented humans increasingly integrated with technology ... .More fundamental limits that may prevent an uncontrollable AGI takeover include irreducible uncertainty about the future and computational complexity that scales exponentially with the size of the problem as well as various hardware limits of computation.

Some AI and AGI researchers may be reluctant to discuss risks, worrying that policymakers do not have sophisticated knowledge of the field and are prone to be convinced by "alarmist" messages, or worrying that such messages will lead to cuts in AI funding. Slate notes that some researchers are dependent on grants from government agencies such as DARPA.

Several skeptics argue that the potential near-term benefits of AI outweigh the risks. Facebook CEO Mark Zuckerberg believes AI will "unlock a huge amount of positive things", such as curing disease and increasing the safety of autonomous cars.

Intermediate views 
Intermediate views generally take the position that the control problem of artificial general intelligence may exist, but that it will be solved via progress in artificial intelligence, for example by creating a moral learning environment for the AI, taking care to spot clumsy malevolent behavior (the 'sordid stumble') and then directly intervening in the code before the AI refines its behavior, or even peer pressure from friendly AIs. In a 2015 panel discussion in The Wall Street Journal devoted to AI risks, IBM's vice-president of Cognitive Computing, Guruduth S. Banavar, brushed off discussion of AGI with the phrase, "it is anybody's speculation." Geoffrey Hinton, the "godfather of deep learning", noted that "there is not a good track record of less intelligent things controlling things of greater intelligence", but stated that he continues his research because "the prospect of discovery is too sweet". In 2004, law professor Richard Posner wrote that dedicated efforts for addressing AI can wait, but that we should gather more information about the problem in the meanwhile.

Popular reaction 
In a 2014 article in The Atlantic, James Hamblin noted that most people do not care one way or the other about artificial general intelligence, and characterized his own gut reaction to the topic as: "Get out of here. I have a hundred thousand things I am concerned about at this exact moment. Do I seriously need to add to that a technological singularity?"

During a 2016 Wired interview of President Barack Obama and MIT Media Lab's Joi Ito, Ito stated: 

Obama added:

Hillary Clinton stated in What Happened:

In a YouGov poll of the public for the British Science Association, about a third of survey respondents said AI will pose a threat to the long-term survival of humanity. Referencing a poll of its readers, Slate's Jacob Brogan stated that "most of the (readers filling out our online survey) were unconvinced that A.I. itself presents a direct threat."

In 2018, a SurveyMonkey poll of the American public by USA Today found 68% thought the real current threat remains "human intelligence"; however, the poll also found that 43% said superintelligent AI, if it were to happen, would result in "more harm than good", and 38% said it would do "equal amounts of harm and good".

One techno-utopian viewpoint expressed in some popular fiction is that AGI may tend towards peace-building.

Mitigation 

Many scholars concerned about the AGI existential risk believe that the best approach is to conduct substantial research into solving the difficult "control problem" to answer the question: what types of safeguards, algorithms, or architectures can programmers implement to maximize the probability that their recursively-improving AI would continue to behave in a friendly, rather than destructive, manner after it reaches superintelligence? Such searchers also admit the possibility of social measures to mitigate the AGI existential risk; for instance, one recommendation is for a UN-sponsored "Benevolent AGI Treaty" that would ensure only altruistic ASIs be created. Similarly, an arms control approach has been suggested, as has a global peace treaty grounded in the international relations theory of conforming instrumentalism, with an ASI potentially being a signatory.

Researchers at Google have proposed research into general "AI safety" issues to simultaneously mitigate both short-term risks from narrow AI and long-term risks from AGI. A 2020 estimate places global spending on AI existential risk somewhere between $10 and $50 million, compared with global spending on AI around perhaps $40 billion. Bostrom suggests a general principle of "differential technological development", that funders should consider working to speed up the development of protective technologies relative to the development of dangerous ones. Some funders, such as Elon Musk, propose that radical human cognitive enhancement could be such a technology, for example through direct neural linking between human and machine; however, others argue that enhancement technologies may themselves pose an existential risk. Researchers, if they are not caught off-guard, could closely monitor or attempt to box in an initial AI at a risk of becoming too powerful, as an attempt at a stop-gap measure. A dominant superintelligent AI, if it were aligned with human interests, might itself take action to mitigate the risk of takeover by rival AI, although the creation of the dominant AI could itself pose an existential risk.

Institutions such as the Machine Intelligence Research Institute, the Future of Humanity Institute, the Future of Life Institute, the Centre for the Study of Existential Risk, and the Center for Human-Compatible AI are involved in mitigating existential risk from advanced artificial intelligence, for example by research into friendly artificial intelligence.

Views on banning and regulation

Banning 
There is nearly universal agreement that attempting to ban research into artificial intelligence would be unwise, and probably futile. Skeptics argue that regulation of AI would be completely valueless, as no existential risk exists. Almost all of the scholars who believe existential risk exists agree with the skeptics that banning research would be unwise, as research could be moved to countries with looser regulations or conducted covertly. The latter issue is particularly relevant, as artificial intelligence research can be done on a small scale without substantial infrastructure or resources. Two additional hypothetical difficulties with bans (or other regulation) are that technology entrepreneurs statistically tend towards general skepticism about government regulation, and that businesses could have a strong incentive to (and might well succeed at) fighting regulation and politicizing the underlying debate.

Regulation 

Elon Musk called for some sort of regulation of AI development as early as 2017. According to NPR, the Tesla CEO is "clearly not thrilled" to be advocating for government scrutiny that could impact his own industry, but believes the risks of going completely without oversight are too high: "Normally the way regulations are set up is when a bunch of bad things happen, there's a public outcry, and after many years a regulatory agency is set up to regulate that industry. It takes forever. That, in the past, has been bad but not something which represented a fundamental risk to the existence of civilisation." Musk states the first step would be for the government to gain "insight" into the actual status of current research, warning that "Once there is awareness, people will be extremely afraid... [as] they should be." In response, politicians express skepticism about the wisdom of regulating a technology that is still in development.

Responding both to Musk and to February 2017 proposals by European Union lawmakers to regulate AI and robotics, Intel CEO Brian Krzanich argued that artificial intelligence is in its infancy and that it is too early to regulate the technology. Instead of trying to regulate the technology itself, some scholars suggest to rather develop common norms including requirements for the testing and transparency of algorithms, possibly in combination with some form of warranty. Developing well regulated weapons systems is in line with the ethos of some countries' militaries. On October 31, 2019, the United States Department of Defense's (DoD's) Defense Innovation Board published the draft of a report outlining five principles for weaponized AI and making 12 recommendations for the ethical use of artificial intelligence by the DoD that seeks to manage the control problem in all DoD weaponized AI.

Regulation of AGI would likely be influenced by regulation of weaponized or militarized AI, i.e., the AI arms race, the regulation of which is an emerging issue. At present, although the United Nations is making progress towards regulation of AI, its institutional and legal capability to manage the AGI existential risk is much more limited. Any form of international regulation will likely be influenced by developments in leading countries' domestic policy towards militarized AI, in the US under the purview of the National Security Commission on Artificial Intelligence, and international moves to regulate an AI arms race. Regulation of research into AGI focuses on the role of review boards and encouraging research into safe AI, and the possibility of differential technological progress (prioritizing risk-reducing strategies over risk-taking strategies in AI development) or conducting international mass surveillance to perform AGI arms control. Regulation of conscious AGIs focuses on integrating them with existing human society and can be divided into considerations of their legal standing and of their moral rights. AI arms control will likely require the institutionalization of new international norms embodied in effective technical specifications combined with active monitoring and informal diplomacy by communities of experts, together with a legal and political verification process.

See also 

 AI takeover
 Artificial intelligence arms race
 Artificial philosophy
 Effective altruism § Long-term future and global catastrophic risks
 Gray goo
 Human Compatible
 Lethal autonomous weapon
Regulation of algorithms
Regulation of artificial intelligence
 Robot ethics § In popular culture
 Superintelligence: Paths, Dangers, Strategies
Suffering risks
 System accident
 Technological singularity
The Precipice: Existential Risk and the Future of Humanity
 Paperclip Maximizer

Notes

References

Bibliography 
 

 
Future problems
Human extinction
Technology hazards
Doomsday scenarios